The 2015 World Short Track Speed Skating Championships took place from 13 to 15 March 2015 in Moscow, Russia. They were the 40th World Short Track Speed Skating Championships.

Medal table

Medalists
* Skaters who did not participate in the final, but received medals.

Men

Women

References

External links
 ISU website
Results book

2015
2015 in short track speed skating
Sports competitions in Moscow
2015 in Russian sport
International speed skating competitions hosted by Russia
2015 in Moscow
March 2015 sports events in Russia